The New York Society Library (NYSL) is the oldest cultural institution in New York City. It was founded in 1754 by the New York Society as a subscription library. During the time when New York was the capital of the United States, it was the de facto Library of Congress. Until the establishment of the New York Public Library in 1895, it functioned as the city's library as well. It has been patronized by a wide variety of literary and political figures, from George Washington to Wendy Wasserstein. Its special collections include books from the libraries of John Winthrop and Lorenzo Da Ponte.

Since 1937, the library has been housed in the former John S. Rogers Mansion at 53 East 79th Street on Manhattan's Upper East Side, the fifth location in its history. The stone Renaissance Revival building was one of the earliest recognized as a New York City landmark in 1967, and it was further listed on the National Register of Historic Places (as the John S. Rogers House) in 1983 in recognition of both its architecture and the library's historic role in the city.

The library's collection of 300,000 volumes includes audio recordings and periodicals, as well as books on a broad range of subjects. It is open for browsing and research by the general public; only members may borrow books or use the upper floors. The library is a non-profit organization supported primarily by its membership fees and endowment.

History

Six residents of New York City, which was then located primarily on what is now Lower Manhattan, formed the New York Society in 1754. At the time, the city did not have a library, and the New York Society believed that such an institution would be useful to the community. They convinced Colonial Governor James DeLancey to let them use a room in the original City Hall, at Wall and Broad streets, for that purpose. In 1772, the Society received a charter from King George III.

During the Revolutionary War, New York was occupied by the British Army. The library's small collection suffered from extensive looting. Soldiers tore book paper up to make wadding for their muskets, or sold the books for rum. After independence was achieved in 1783, the New York State Legislature recognized the library's charter. During that time, Congress was meeting in the building in New York City.

The NYSL effectively served as the first Library of Congress for two years, and its records show borrowings by George Washington, John Adams and Alexander Hamilton, among other early American notables from that time. Washington is believed to have failed to return two books due in 1789; the library has announced that it plans to waive the $300,000 fine but is still seeking the return of the books.

After Congress moved out, the library built its collection back up again to 5,000 volumes and moved to its own building on Nassau Street. It continued to grow in membership and volumes, remaining there through 1840, when it joined the New York Atheneum at Leonard Street and Broadway. Among the visitors recorded at that location were Henry David Thoreau and John James Audubon. Edgar Allan Poe and Ralph Waldo Emerson lectured there.

Like other subscription libraries at the time, members paid a membership fee to  access the collection. A board of trustees was elected which hired the librarians, chose materials for the collection and drafted and enforced regulations for library use.   The nature of the collection represented the ideals of the library and contained works of a great variety. Although Christian theological texts were included, so was the Koran and books on Catholic saints and popes. There was a variety of natural philosophy texts alongside works by Shakespeare. Resources were also available for a variety of vocational purposes, including manuals for merchants and farmers.

By 1856, the collection had reached 35,000 and it was once again time for the library to move. A larger building for its exclusive use was erected at 109 University Place, reflecting the city's continuing northerly expansion. Herman Melville and Willa Cather were among the visitors to that location. It had a double-height central reading room and shelf space for 100,000 books.  This building would serve the NYSL for 81 years.

In 1937, with the collection having grown to 150,000 volumes, the library moved to its present location at 53 East 79th Street, on the Upper East Side between Madison and Park avenues. It was thanks to a generous donation from the Goodhue family that enabled the purchase of the building, which was a mansion built just 20 years earlier. Notable patrons at the present location have ranged from W. H. Auden and Lillian Hellman in the early years to David Halberstam and Wendy Wasserstein more recently.

Building

Trowbridge & Livingston designed the house at 53 East 79th Street for the John S. Rogers family in 1917, in the firm's later years. Most of their buildings in the city were commercial, such as the B. Altman and Company Building and the St. Regis Hotel on Fifth Avenue, and the east wing of the American Museum of Natural History. The John S. Rogers House is considered a prime example of their residential work.

The library is housed in a five-story, three-bay building faced in limestone. The main entrance at street level, behind a long awning, is flanked by two Doric pilasters supporting a horizontal lintel, set in rusticated stone. Above that story is a full-width balustrade.

On the upper stories the stone is laid in an ashlar pattern with quoins at the corners. The second story windows are double glass doors topped with carved bracketed pediments (rounded in the center). Belt courses at sill level divide the stories. Above the fifth story the roofline is marked by a frieze and cornice topped by another balustrade. Behind it is a small terrace sheltered by a wide overhang. An end chimney rises from the gabled tile roof.

The interior was extensively modified for the library in 1937. Much of this effort was focused on the rear; when it was completed, 39 rooms had been combined into 24. Original treatments remain, such as the coffered ceilings, stone walls and arched entryways on the first and second floors. The wood paneling and mantels in the card catalog room, second floor lounge and director's office is also original. Architectural historian Henry Hope Reed Jr. has described the main stairs as "the only [ones] in New York fit for a cardinal".

Programs and collections

Members pay an annual fee of $350 for a family, $335 for a couple, $270 for an individual to gain borrowing privileges and access to the upper floors, with two closed stacks, a members' lounge and exhibit hall.  There's also a $100 e-membership which includes access to the digital collection and 10 building visits a year.  Those fees and the library's endowment support a staff of 18 full-time and 26 part-time employees, supplemented by several volunteers and headed by director Carolyn Waters. The library acquires an average of 4,000 new volumes every year and subscribes to approximately 100 periodicals.

The collection also includes a children's library and 10,000 volumes in its special collections. Foremost among these latter are 290 books from the personal library kept by Puritan settler John Winthrop and his descendants. Another significant collection are the Italian-language books kept by Mozart's librettist Lorenzo Da Ponte, who spent his last years in New York. He started an Italian Library Society in 1827 under the New York Society's auspices, to supplement his courses at Columbia, the first college courses in that language in the United States. Those 600 volumes made up a large share of the library's 1838 catalog, and are today separately organized as the Da Ponte collection.

Head librarians
Head librarians have included:

 1755–56:   John Morin Scott
 1756–57:   George Duncan Ludlow
 1765–68:   Thomas Jackson
 1768–74:   James Wilmot
 1774–89:   George Murray
 1789–90:   George Wright
 1790–94:   Isaac Leonard Kip
 1794–97:   John P. Pearss
 1797–1824: John Forbes
 1824–28:   Burtis Skidmore
 1828–55:   Phillip Jones Forbes
 1855–57:   John MacMullen
 1857–95:   Wentworth Sanborn Bulter
 1895–1936: Frank Barna Bigelow
 1936–54:   Edith Hall Crowell
 1954–78:   Sylvia Hilton
 1978–2005: Mark Piel
 2005–06:   Charles Cronin
 2006–15:   Mark Bartlett
 2015–present:   Carolyn Waters

See also
 List of museums and cultural institutions in New York City
 List of New York City Designated Landmarks in Manhattan from 14th to 59th Streets
 National Register of Historic Places listings in Manhattan from 14th to 59th Streets

Notes

References

Further reading
 King, M. Books and People: Five Decades of New York's Oldest Library. New York: Macmillan, 1954.
 Glynn, Tom. "The New York Society Library: Books, Authority, and Publics in Colonial and Early Republican New York". Libraries & Culture 40:4, Fall 2005.

External links

 New York Society Library website

1754 establishments in the Province of New York
Educational institutions established in 1754
Houses completed in 1917
Libraries established in 1754
Libraries in British North America
Libraries in Manhattan
Libraries on the National Register of Historic Places in Manhattan
New York City Designated Landmarks in Manhattan
Private libraries in the United States
Societies in New York (state)
Subscription libraries in the United States